The following is a list of children of King Chulalongkorn.

Ancestors

List of consorts

List of children

See also
List of children of Mongkut

References

Thai monarchy
Chulalongkorn
 
Wives by person
Chulalongkorn
Chulalongkorn